DIOP (2,3-O-isopropylidene-2,3-dihydroxy-1,4-bis(diphenylphosphino)butane) is an organophosphorus compound that is used as a chiral ligand in asymmetric catalysis.  It is a white solid that is soluble in organic solvents.

DIOP is prepared from the acetonide of d,l-tartaric acid, which is reduced prior to attachment of the PPh2 substituents.

Use
The DIOP ligand binds to metals via conformationally flexible seven-membered C4P2M chelate ring.  

DIOP is a historically important in the development of ligands for use in asymmetric catalysis,  an atom-economical method for the preparation of chiral compounds. Described in 1971, it was the first example of a C2-symmetric diphosphine. Its complexes have been applied to the reduction of prochiral olefins, ketones, and imines.  Knowles et al. independently reported the related C2-symmetric diphosphine DIPAMP.
 
Since the discovery of DIOP, many analogues of DIOP have been introduced. These DIOP derivatives include MOD-DIOP, Cy-DIOP, DIPAMP, and DBP-DIOP. Out of many derivatives, DBP-DIOP exhibits good regio- and enantioselectivity in the hydroformylation of butenes and styrene.  DIOP was the first chiral ligand used in the platinum-tin-catalyzed hydroformylation. The reactivity, chemo – and the enantioselectivity of DIOP is influenced by CO and H2 pressure and polarity of the solvents. The best results in asymmetric hydroformylation are achieved in solvents with medium polarity: benzene and toluene.

References

Chelating agents
Diphosphines
Phenyl compounds